"Only One" is the third single from American band Yellowcard. This song is the third and last single from Ocean Avenue and the sixth track. Known for being another TRL hit, it is one of Yellowcard's lengthier tracks, partly due to its violin solo.

"Only One" was shortened, from 4:17 to 3:55, for radio airplay purposes. The violin solo in the bridge was cut.

In this song, vocalist/guitarist Ryan Key plays the bass. The video was the last to feature Ben Harper as the lead guitarist, and the first to feature Pete Mosely as the bassist. The video also stars actress Rachel Miner.

Background
In an interview with MTV News in May 2004, Key revealed that a riff for "Only One" was discovered by accident. "We were testing something else out and just tracked it right away. We then added a drum loop to it and just kept adding tracks. We built it track by track in the studio, and we've never really done that before." Key also noted that the song was based on one of his previous relationships; "It was a weird breakup. It was one of those where I felt like I had to do it, even though she didn't do anything wrong. I just needed some space to figure life out for a while on my own. And I think that's what the song says."

The following month, in a follow-up with MTV News, the band revealed that the song was one of their "chick song[s]" off Ocean Avenue. Ryan Key in discussion of the song, said that rather than rage or mend, the song simply sets out to apologize; The lyric, "Made my mistakes, let you down / And I can't, I can't hold on for too long / Ran my whole life in the ground / And I can't, I can't get up when you're gone", were written in the theme of apologizing. In the same interview, Key said: "We usually have everything written, ready to go before we go in there [studio], but it was really fun because we built it from the ground up. It's a cool, different song for us. It's been real challenging for us to play live because we never really practice it, which keeps it fresh."

"Only One" is a ballad and the music featured is heavily coated with string arrangements.

Release and promotion
Yellowcard released "Only One" in the United States on June 2004 as the third single from Ocean Avenue. "Only One" peaked at number 15 on the US' Billboard's Hot Modern Rock Tracks chart and number 28 on the Mainstream Top 40 (Pop Songs).

The song received positive reviews from critics. Nick Madsen of IGN, in review of the album, wrote: "...'Only One', Ryan Key weaves a sad tale of love lost by choice. One of the few depressing songs on the album this track sees Key stealing the show with heart-wrenching melodies and desperate vocals. Honesty is a trend throughout this album and this song is a prime example of how sincerity can up the ante in the emotional department." Tekindra Jones of The Daily Vidette, wrote: "The song that stuck out the most to me on this CD was 'Only One'. The song is about another romantic relationship coming to an end. The lyrics explore the ensuing frustration which occurs when two people are in love but cannot make their relationship work. The music provided an excellent illustration of the need to let go as it was described in the lyrics."

On May 1, 2012, "Only One" was added as a downloadable song for Rock Band 3.

Track list
"Only One"
"View from Heaven" (Acoustic - from AOL session)
"Miles Apart" (Live - from Electric Factory)

Charts and sales

Peak positions

Certifications

References

2004 singles
2000s ballads
Yellowcard songs
Capitol Records singles
2003 songs
Song recordings produced by Neal Avron
Music videos directed by Phil Harder
Rock ballads
Torch songs